Irish singer Sinéad O'Connor has released ten studio albums: The Lion and the Cobra (1987), I Do Not Want What I Haven't Got (1990), Am I Not Your Girl? (1992), Universal Mother (1994), Faith and Courage (2000), Sean-Nós Nua (2002), Throw Down Your Arms (2005), Theology (2007), How About I Be Me (and You Be You)? (2012), and I'm Not Bossy, I'm the Boss (2014).

The extended play Gospel Oak (1997) and live album Live at the Sugar Club (2008) were also issued, and O'Connor's compilations consist of five setsSo Far... The Best Of (1997), Sinéad O'Connor: Best Of (2000), She Who Dwells in the Secret Place of the Most High Shall Abide Under the Shadow of the Almighty (2003), Collaborations (2005) and Essential (2005). In addition, O'Connor also released four video albums, and overall thirty-four singles.

Albums

Studio albums

Compilation albums

Live albums

Extended plays

Singles

As lead artist

As featured artist

Other appearances

As primary artist

Other songs

Guest appearances

Videos

Video albums

Music videos

Filmography

References

Discographies of Irish artists
Folk music discographies
Pop music discographies
Rock music discographies
Discography